Domenik Osen (1891–1970), also known as Erwin Dom Osen and Mime Van Osen, was an Austrian mime artist.

Osen was depicted by the Austrian Expressionist painter Egon Schiele in a series of portraits during the early 1900s.

References

1891 births
1970 deaths
Austrian male stage actors
Mimes